Carl Coerse (15 November 1892 – 13 December 1953) was a Dutch wrestler. He competed at the 1920 and 1924 Summer Olympics.

References

External links
 

1892 births
1953 deaths
Olympic wrestlers of the Netherlands
Wrestlers at the 1920 Summer Olympics
Wrestlers at the 1924 Summer Olympics
Dutch male sport wrestlers
Sportspeople from Amsterdam